Nazaneen Ghaffar is a British television weather presenter. She was born on 9 June 1985.
She currently appears on the TalkTV channel, having previously presented for BBC South East Today, ITV West and Sky News.

Early life
Ghaffar grew up in Tunbridge Wells, Kent, where she attended St James’ Primary School and Tunbridge Wells Girls' Grammar School. After completing her A-levels she studied for a BA (hons) degree in Broadcasting at the Ravensbourne College of Design and Communication in Greenwich.
Her parents are Iranians who met in England.

Television career
Upon graduating in 2006, her first television industry job was for Endemol in Bristol as a runner for the programme Deal or No Deal. After moving on to ITV West, her first on-screen opportunity was when she was asked to audition a weather presenting position and trained  at the Met Office. After 18 months of presenting for ITV she moved back to Kent to join the BBC's South East Today programme.

On 4 November 2010 it was announced that Ghaffar was leaving the BBC to join Sky News as weather presenter on its Sunrise programme, replacing Lucy Verasamy who had left to join ITV's Daybreak. She also presented forecasts for Sky News-produced 5 News on Channel 5 until 19 February 2012.

On 25 April 2022, Ghaffar left Sky News to join TalkTV on the weather segment after TalkTV News.

Personal life
Ghaffar married BBC reporter Charlie Rose in August 2016.

References

External links
 
 BBC South East Today presenter profile 
 

British meteorologists
Living people
Sky News weather forecasters
People educated at Tunbridge Wells Girls' Grammar School
People from Royal Tunbridge Wells
British people of Iranian descent
1985 births
Alumni of Ravensbourne University London
Place of birth missing (living people)